The Hyde House is a historic house at 400 North Second Street in Augusta, Arkansas.  It is a single-story wood-frame structure, three bays wide, with a front facing gable roof and a temple-front porch sheltering its centered entrance.  The entrance is flanked by sidelight windows and topped by a three-light transom window.  The porch has a wide freeze and pedimented gable, and is supported by round columns with simple capitals.  Built c. 1865, it is a fine local example of Greek Revival architecture.

The house was listed on the National Register of Historic Places in 2011.

See also
National Register of Historic Places listings in Woodruff County, Arkansas

References

Houses on the National Register of Historic Places in Arkansas
Greek Revival houses in Arkansas
Houses completed in 1865
Houses in Woodruff County, Arkansas
National Register of Historic Places in Woodruff County, Arkansas
1865 establishments in Arkansas
Augusta, Arkansas